Yoon Jong-hoon (born February 15, 1984) is a South Korean actor.

Filmography

Film

Television series

Web series

Television show

Music video

Theater

Awards and nominations

References

External links
 
 
 
 

1984 births
Living people
South Korean male television actors
South Korean male film actors
South Korean male stage actors
People from Daejeon